Wroxall Abbey is a substantial Victorian mansion house situated at Wroxall, Warwickshire which was converted for use as a hotel, spa, wedding venue and conference centre. It is a Grade II listed building.

History

Built in 1141 by Sir Hugh de Hatton, the estate was occupied for some 400 years by Wroxall Priory, a Benedictine monastery of nuns, until the Dissolution of the Monasteries by Henry VIII in 1536.

In 1544 the King granted the estate to Robert Burgoyne of Sutton, Bedfordshire(d 1545) who had been one of the King's Commissioners for the Dissolution. His son Robert (d 1613), High Sheriff of Warwickshire in 1597, built a manor house  in Elizabethan style adjacent to the priory ruins.

Wren used the house as his country retreat, and it was occupied from time to time by members of his family, including his great-great-grandson Christopher Roberts Wren, High Sheriff of Warwickshire in 1820. Later descendants sold the estate in 1861 to James Dugdale, High Sheriff of Warwickshire 1868, who demolished the old manor house and replaced it with an imposing mansion, thereafter to be known as Wroxall Abbey, in the Victorian Gothic style.

The Lady Chapel adjacent to the Hall, now a church dedicated to St Leonard, and popularly known as Wren's Cathedral, is a Grade I listed building. It is  a cathedral of the Free Methodist Church and is used for regular services and weddings. The nearby ruins of the 12th century abbey are Grade II* listed.

The house was let and was occupied as a girls' school from 1936 to 1995.  In 1995 the estate was purchased by the Quinn family, who leased it to a commercial company in 2001. The lessees converted the estate into a hotel.

References

    A History of the County of Warwick, Volume 3 (1945) pp215-220  Wroxall from British History Online
  - 1990 description

External links
 Wroxall Abbey Estate website
 Photos of Wroxall Abbey and surrounding area on geograph.org

Country houses in Warwickshire
History of Warwickshire
Grade II listed buildings in Warwickshire
Grade II listed houses
Houses completed in 1141